Big Big World may refer to:

 Big Big World (album), a 1998 album by Emilia Rydberg
 "Big Big World" (song), the title song
 Big Big World (film), a 2016 Turkish film
 Big Big World (TV series), a travel TV series produced and broadcast by Hong Kong's TVB

See also
 It's a Big Big World, a TV series which airs on PBS Kids
 Big World (disambiguation)